Perevoz is an rural locality (a "Posyolok", settlement) in Bodaybinsky District of Irkutsk Oblast, Russia. Population:

Administrative status
Perevoz is the capital of the Zhuinsky Rural Settlement (Жуинское сельское поселение) municipal unit, which includes the Perevoz rural locality and the Bolshoy Patom village to the north.

Geography 
The Khomolkho, one of the Zhuya's main tributaries, flows into the Zhuya opposite the settlement.

History
Perevoz is located in an area traditionally inhabited by Evenks. In 1632, a Russian detachment led by then Yenisei Governor Peter Beketov came to the place where the village now stands.

Following the discovery of gold in 1846, the settlement of Perevoz began to develop steadily. Currently, despite a slight decrease in population since the turn of the century, the town has most modern amenities and is located at the head of the 25N-092 highway.

References

Rural localities in Irkutsk Oblast